Inga cinnamomea is a species of plant in the family Fabaceae. It is distributed from Colombia to Bolivia, including Amazonian Brazil. The common name ingá-guaçú (giant inga) is in reference to the very large fruit pod.

References

cinnamomea
Flora of Brazil
Flora of Bolivia
Flora of Colombia